Turku Castle is a medieval building in the city of Turku in Finland. Together with Turku Cathedral, the castle is one of the oldest buildings still in use and the largest surviving medieval building in Finland. It was founded in the late 13th century and stands on the banks of the Aura River. The castle served as a bastion and administrative centre in Eastland, as Finland was known during its time as a province of Sweden. Only once did the castle figure in the defence of the realm,  when Russian invaders from Novgorod destroyed Turku in 1318. It more frequently played a role in internal struggles for power within Sweden and the Kalmar Union. The castle's heyday was in the mid-16th century during the reign of Duke John of Finland and Catherine Jagellon. That was when the Renaissance Floor and King's and Queen's hall were built, along with other features. It lost its status as an administrative centre in the 17th century after Per Brahe's period as governor-general of Finland came to an end. Turku castle is today Finland's most visited museum, with attendance reaching 200,000 in some years. In addition, many of the larger rooms are used for municipal functions.

History 
A start was made on building the castle in about 1280. The Swedish conquerors of Finland intended it originally as a military fortress. During the next two centuries its defences were strengthened and living quarters were added. The castle served as a bastion and administrative centre in Eastland, as Finland was known during the time as a province of Sweden. The main part of the castle was extended considerably during the 16th century after Gustav Vasa had ascended the Swedish throne and his son John headed the Finnish administration following his promotion to duke. The bailey was also supplemented and the round tower at the southeast corner of the bailey was added. Since then no part of the castle has been added or extended, only repaired.

The castle was ruled in different stages of its history by the castle sheriff, commander, regent, duke or governor-general. Its significance as a defensive fortress and administrative centre varied throughout the ages according to the political situation. Only once did the castle actually figure in the defence of the realm. This was when Russian invaders from Novgorod destroyed Turku in 1318. On the other hand, it frequently played a role in internal struggles for power within Sweden and the Kalmar Union. Not until the end of 16th century did it really enjoy peace. The castle lost its status as an administrative centre in the 17th century after Per Brahe's period as governor-general of Finland came to an end.

In the Middle Ages, Turku Castle may have been a base for the notorious pirates called Victual Brothers, as there were hosts sympathetic to them. The chief of the Turku Castle in years 1395–1398 was the squire , who was on good terms with the Victual Brothers and their leaders. In one important source about the Middle Ages, Paulus Juusten's episcopal chronicle, it is said that at the turn of the 15th century, pirates and Russians would have caused great destruction to the Turku Cathedral.

Many accidents have assailed the castle, especially numerous sieges. In 1614, when King Gustav II Adolf visited the castle, a tremendous fire destroyed the wooden structure of the main castle almost completely. After this the main castle was abandoned and used partly as a store, partly just stood empty. A new accident beset the castle in the summer of 1941 soon after the Continuation War had begun when a Russian incendiary bomb hit the main castle.

The bailey functioned as an administrative centre when the main castle stood empty. In addition to the governor-general the lord-lieutenant lived there during the 17th century and after the period of Greater Wrath it housed the provincial government for some time. One of the most colourful periods in the castle's history was when it was a prison from the 18th century to the end of 19th century. When the Finnish war began in 1808 the castle was used by the Russian navy and only handed over to the Finnish authorities a couple of decades later, after the country had been granted autonomous status within the Russian empire. The Turku Historical Museum founded in 1881 began its occupation of the bailey immediately after the museum was founded and later it was given quarters in the castle itself.

The renovation of the castle, which was begun before the Second World War and interrupted by Finland's two wars with the Soviet Union, was completed in 1987. The completely restored castle was handed over on October 12, 1993, to the City of Turku which is entrusted with its operation for the Finnish state, its owner. The building is owned and maintained by the Finnish state and is entrusted to the use of the city of Turku. The castle functions in its entirety as a historical museum as part of the Turku provincial museum. In the main part of the castle are banquet rooms for the city of Turku, a church for the local congregation and also restaurants in both the main castle and the bailey. Today the castle is once more experiencing a heyday as it has achieved the status of being one of Finland's most visited museums.

Construction 

The layout of the castle consists of the Medieval keep (päälinna) and Renaissance bailey (esilinna).

In the Middle Ages the castle was surrounded by a moat conjoining with the River Aura, the castle effectively lying on an island. The keep was completed in the early 15th century. Construction of the bailey was begun in the late 15th century and finished in the 16th. The bailey is not as heavily fortified as the keep, but it has several turrets. The Renaissance construction work included heavy modification of nearly all the rooms in the older medieval part of the castle. Since the Renaissance no additions have been made to the castle.

The modest military fortification grew into a massive greystone castle, whose solid walls have witnessed many milestones in Nordic history. The castle has been subject to numerous sieges and several battles have been waged aside its walls. Of all Finnish castles, Turku castle has the most warlike history besides Vyborg castle and Olavinlinna.

The castle's heyday was in the mid-16th century during the reign of Duke John of Finland and Catherine Jagellon. That was when the Renaissance Floor and King's and Queen's hall were built, along with other features.

The castle was the center of the historical province of Finland Proper, and the administrative center of all of Finland. Its strong walls and dungeons also served as the state prison for centuries; even today, a prison is colloquially referred to as linna (castle) in Finnish. The castle has been the place of many historical events; in 1573–1579, for example, the deposed Swedish queen 
Karin Månsdotter was kept prisoner here.

The castle is Finland's most visited museum, with attendance reaching 200,000 in some years. In addition, many of the larger rooms are used for municipal functions.

Medieval castellans 

Various castellans, bailiffs, military commanders, governors who held Turku Castle in the Middle Ages:

 1280s Carolus Gustavi
 early 14th century Nils Andersson and Harald Torsteinsson
 1315–22 Lyder van Kyren, from Holstein
 1324–26 Matts Kettilmundsson (concentrated commerce in Turku, brought a courtly and knightly culture)
 1326 Karl Näskonungsson
 1340 Dan Nilsson
 c. 1348 Gerhard Skytte
 1358 Nils Turesson Bielke
 1359 King Magnus IV, represented by Bishop Hemming
 c. 1360 Narve Ingevaldsen from Norway
 1375 Bo Jonsson Grip, died 1386
 1387 Jeppe Abrahamsson Djäkn
 1395 Knut Bosson (Grip)
 1399 the Union monarchs (Margaret I of Denmark & Eric of Pomerania)
 1411 Klaus Lydekesson Djäkn
 1435 Hans Kröpelin
 1441 Karl Knutsson (the future Charles VIII of Sweden)
 1457–63: Kristofer Bengtsson Oxenstierna
 1465 Erik Axelsson Tott
 1469 Sten Sture the Elder
 1499 Magnus Frille (appointed by King Hans)
 1501 Sten Sture the Elder
 1503 Svante Nilsson
 1512 Kristofer Klasson Horn

In popular culture 
The Turku Castle is the setting for the fairy tale The Tomten in Åbo Castle written by Zachris Topelius in 1849. At the time of writing, Turku Castle was badly damaged, and just like Victor Hugo's The Hunchback of Notre-Dame in the case of Notre-Dame de Paris, the story of Topelius had a major influence on the desire to restore this important landmark of Turku.

The walls of the castle or the castle itself are also featured in many Finnish films. These include the adventure film Sadan miekan mies from 1951 directed by Ilmari Unho and drama film The Girl King from 2015 directed by Mika Kaurismäki.

Gallery

References 

 Turku Castle, Guide to the Main Castle. Turku Provincial Museum. Translated by Christopher Grapes. Jyväskylä: Gummerus Kirjapaino Oy, 1996. .

External links 

 Website of Turku Castle
 Medieval castles in Finland
 Photos of Turku castle
 History of the castle (in Finnish)
 Turku Castle – photos
 The Association of Castles and Museums around the Baltic Sea

Buildings and structures in Turku
Castles in Finland
Museums in Turku
Historic house museums in Finland